Santa Fe is a small town in Bolivia. It is located in the Oruro Department.

References 

Populated places in Oruro Department